"The Ballad of Peter Pumpkinhead" is a song written by Andy Partridge of English rock band XTC for their 1992 album Nonsuch. It was their second number one hit on the US Billboard Modern Rock Tracks chart, after "Mayor of Simpleton", and reached number 71 on the UK Singles Chart. The song tells the story of Peter Pumpkinhead, a man who comes to an unspecified town and provides aid for the poor and homeless. He gains widespread public approval, but the government comes to resent his success and tries in vain to malign his reputation. Peter is ultimately nailed to a block of wood by his enemies, and his death is broadcast on live television.

The song was inspired by a jack o'lantern Partridge had carved and placed on a fence post in his garden for Halloween. Afterward, as he walked past it each day on his way to and from a home studio in which he composed songs, he observed its advancing state of decay and began to feel sorry for it. He said that he began thinking about "what would happen if there was somebody on Earth who was kind of perfect ...  God, they'd make so many enemies!"

Music video
There are two different versions of the XTC music video, both of which feature a scenario very similar to the assassination of President John F. Kennedy, although one is heavily edited for US television broadcast and removes much of the more controversial material. The Kennedy reference is also made explicit by the image of a pig with a map of Cuba superimposed on it—a clear reference to the 1961 Bay of Pigs Invasion. They also briefly feature an actress dressed like Marilyn Monroe during the third verse.

In addition, the uncensored video makes brief reference to Jesus Christ by flashing the words "three nails" and showing a crown of thorns. The lyrics "Peter Pumpkinhead was too good; Had him nailed to a chunk of wood" reinforce this crucifixion reference. It also cross references all three stories by strongly implying that the death of all three were caused by some sort of government conspiracy. It is of note that during the last verse of the uncensored video, there are shots of evidence bags marked with the tags "X" (possibly a reference to Malcolm X), "R" (possibly a reference to Robert F. Kennedy) and (together) "J" and "F".

Crash Test Dummies version

The song was covered by Canadian group Crash Test Dummies in 1994 for the soundtrack to the film Dumb and Dumber. It was the first Crash Test Dummies single to feature Ellen Reid on lead vocals.

The cover was originally recorded to give Reid another song for live performances; the creators of Dumb and Dumber then approached the band about including it on the film's soundtrack. Reid said of the song, "It's about a person when they try to do good in the world, but people turn against them. Someone who is trying to do good, but is persecuted."

The music video was filmed in Nathan Phillips Square, home to City Hall in Toronto, Ontario; fans of the band were invited to an open casting by VJs on MuchMusic. It features Jeff Daniels reprising his role of "Harry Dunne" from Dumb and Dumber.  In the video, Harry falls and gets a Jack-o'-lantern stuck on his head.  In his struggle to get it off, he foils a bank robbery and becomes a media sensation.  However, he is unfairly found guilty of the bank robbery and narrowly avoids being hanged (he is saved by the pumpkin, which is placed on his head before he's put in the noose). It ends with a spoof of the religious imagery in the original video, as Harry's followers (oblivious to him having survived) venerate him as a martyr and establish the "Church of the Latter-Day Pumpkinheads" where they don Jack-o'-lantern masks, ape Harry's struggle to remove the pumpkin stuck to his head, and take communion of pumpkin seeds and wine sipped from a pumpkin stem.

Charts

Weekly charts

Year-end charts

See also
 Number one modern rock hits of 1992

References

1992 singles
1992 songs
1995 singles
Crash Test Dummies songs
Jangle pop songs
RCA Records singles
Satirical songs
Song recordings produced by Gus Dudgeon
Songs about fictional male characters
Songs written by Andy Partridge
Virgin Records singles
XTC songs